Private Lives is a South Korean television series starring Seohyun, Go Kyung-pyo, Kim Hyo-jin, Kim Young-min, and Tae Won-seok. It aired on JTBC from October 7 to November 26, 2020 and is available for streaming worldwide on Netflix.

Synopsis
The drama revolves around a group of swindlers who stumbles upon secret information that could harm the nation. Using their skills and conning techniques, they go up against a huge conglomerate to reveal a major “private life”.

Cast

Main
 Seohyun as Cha Joo-eun
 A 29-year-old veteran swindler who doesn't like a hard and nasty life. She is a woman who manipulates her own private life. Since her school days, she has contributed greatly to her family business as a life-type swindler. 
 Go Kyung-pyo as Lee Jung-hwan
 GK Technology Development Team 2's Team Manager. He is a man who threw his private life among crooks to live. He actually runs a detective agency named Spy Detective Agency. Unaware of Joo-eun's private life, Jung-hwan asks her to marry him with a trembling heart, and the marriage of the two goes in a flurry.
 Kim Hyo-jin as Jeong Bok-gi/Sophia Chung
 A former announcer by the name of Jeong Yoon-kyung. She is a woman who uses other people's private lives. When everyone in her country tried to kill her, only Jae-wook reached out a helping hand. She was reborn as a swindler conqueror by holding hand with Jae-wook
 Kim Young-min as Kim Jae-wook/Edward Kim
 A swindler from GK Technology. He is a man who tramples on other people's private lives.

Supporting

People around Cha Joo-eun
 Park Sung-geun as Cha Hyun-tae, Joo-eun's father
 Song Seon-mi as Kim Mi-sook, Joo-eun's mother
 Tae Won-seok as Hanson, Joo-eun's mentor. He was once a boxer and a gangster. He is Mi-sook and Joo-eun's fraud partner. 
 Jang Jin-hee as Jang Min-jung, Joo-eun's best friend who she met at Cheongpa Women's Prison. Min-jung used to run an illegal gambling place for women in Hwaryu.
 Yoo Hee-je as Park Tae-joo
 Yoon Sa-bong as Yang In-sook, retired police officer who has a soft spot for Joo-eun
 Kim Seo-won as President Nam

People around Lee Jung-hwan
 Kim Min-sang as Kim Sang-man, director of Strategic Planning at GK Technology
 Kim Ba-da as Woo Seok-ho, team leader of GK Electronics Strategic Planning Division 2
 Jang Won-hyuk as Choi Yoon-seok/Choi Min-seok, a genius hacker who works at a local computer repair shop called PC Graveyard
 Song Sang-eun as Go Hye-won, manager of the Spy Detective Agency

Police
 Lee Hak-joo as Kim Myung-hyun
 Park Sung-hoon as Jung Dae-sang
 Lee Yun-seol as Kang Soo-jin
 Yoon Jung-hoon as Park Kyung-seop
 Kwak Min-ho as Lee Min-kyu

Others
 Cha Soo-yeon as Oh Hyun-kyung, a lawyer at O&S Law Office
 Shin Ha-young as Yoo Mi-young
 Min Ji-oh as Yoo Byeong-joon
 Lee Jae-eun as Ottu Restaurant employee
 Kong Yoo-seok as Jeong Bok-gi's chauffeur

Special appearances
 Han Kyu-won as Chief Park Jin-woo (Ep. 1-2)
 Kim Kang-il as criminal making deal (Ep. 1)
 Yoo Young-bok as Lee Jung-hwan's father (Ep. 2)
 Kim Joo-ah as Lee Jung-hwan's mother (Ep. 2)

Production
The series marks Go Kyung-pyo's first acting role since his military discharge in January 2020 as well as Kim Hyo-jin's small screen comeback after 8 years.

The first script reading took place in April 2020 at JTBC Building in Sangam-dong, Seoul, South Korea.

The series was originally scheduled to premiere on September 16, 2020 but it was postponed to October 7 due to the COVID-19 pandemic.

Original soundtrack

Part 1

Part 2

Part 3

Part 4

Part 5

Ratings

Notes

References

External links
  
 
 
 

JTBC television dramas
2020 South Korean television series debuts
2020 South Korean television series endings
South Korean crime television series
Fraud in television
Television productions suspended due to the COVID-19 pandemic
Television series by Doremi Entertainment
Korean-language Netflix exclusive international distribution programming